Gordon Frederick Henry Charles Howard, 5th Earl of Effingham (18 May 1873 – 7 July 1946) was an English peer and member of the House of Lords. The son of Hon. Frederick Charles Howard and grandson of Henry Howard, 2nd Earl of Effingham, he inherited the earldom in 1927 from his cousin, Henry Howard, 4th Earl of Effingham.

Early life
Howard was the son of Hon. Frederick Charles Howard (1840–1893) and Lady Constance Eleanora Caroline Finch-Hatton (1851–1910). The Hon. Frederick was the son of Henry Howard, 2nd Earl of Effingham (1806–1899) and Lady Constance was the daughter of George Finch-Hatton, 11th Earl of Winchilsea (1815–1887).

In 1927, Howard inherited the earldom upon the death of his cousin, Henry Howard, 4th Earl of Effingham.

Personal life
He married Rosamond Margaret Hudson in 1904, by whom he had two children:
Mowbray Henry Gordon Howard, 6th Earl of Effingham (1905–1996)
Hon. John Algernon Frederick Charles Howard (29 December 1907 – 24 April 1970)

Howard and Hudson divorced in 1914 and in 1924, he married Madeleine Foshay (d. 1958). He was an art dealer in New York City before inheriting the earldom. Together, Howard and Foshay had one son:
Nicholas Howard (1919–2016)

References

External links

1873 births
1946 deaths
19th-century English people
20th-century English businesspeople
Earls in the Peerage of the United Kingdom
Gordon Howard, 5th Earl of Effingham
Earls of Effingham
English art dealers
English expatriates in the United States
Barons Howard of Effingham